The 1996 Overseas Final was the sixteenth running of the Overseas Final. The Final was held at the Brandon Stadium in Coventry, England on 9 June and was open to riders from the American Final and the Australian, British and New Zealand Championships.

Controversy
The top 8 riders were to have qualified for the 1996 Intercontinental Final to be held in Holsted, Denmark. However, in a controversial decision the FIM disqualified all riders following the meeting, with the exception of Ryan Sullivan (2nd), Kelvin Tatum (5th) and Mark Lemon (14th), for refusing to start the meeting on flat tyres. This led to the FIM putting forward the first 13 riders from the Scandinavian Final to make up the Intercontinental Final shortfall (originally it was to be 8 riders from each of the Overseas and Scandinavian Finals who advanced to the Intercontinental Final).

1996 Overseas Final
9 June
 Coventry, Brandon Stadium
Qualification: See above

References

See also
 Motorcycle Speedway

1996
World Individual